Andrus Kajak (born 11 September 1965) is an Estonian fencer. He competed in the individual and team épée events at the 1996 and 2000 Summer Olympics.

References

External links
 

1965 births
Living people
Estonian male épée fencers
Olympic fencers of Estonia
Fencers at the 1996 Summer Olympics
Fencers at the 2000 Summer Olympics
Sportspeople from Tallinn
20th-century Estonian people
21st-century Estonian people